Irina Klabuhn née Hornig is a skydiver, who competed for the SC Dynamo Hoppegarten / Sportvereinigung (SV) Dynamo. She won many medals at the world championships.

References 

East German skydivers
Living people
Year of birth missing (living people)